This is a list of electoral division results for the Australian 1951 federal election.

Overall
This section is an excerpt from 1951 Australian federal election § House of Representatives

New South Wales

Banks 
This section is an excerpt from Electoral results for the Division of Banks § 1951

Barton 
This section is an excerpt from Electoral results for the Division of Barton § 1951

Bennelong 
This section is an excerpt from Electoral results for the Division of Bennelong § 1951

Blaxland 
This section is an excerpt from Electoral results for the Division of Blaxland § 1951

Bradfield 
This section is an excerpt from Electoral results for the Division of Bradfield § 1951

Calare 
This section is an excerpt from Electoral results for the Division of Calare § 1951

Cook 
This section is an excerpt from Electoral results for the Division of Cook (1906–1955) § 1951

Cowper 
This section is an excerpt from Electoral results for the Division of Cowper § 1951

Cunningham 
This section is an excerpt from Electoral results for the Division of Cunningham § 1951

Dalley 
This section is an excerpt from Electoral results for the Division of Dalley § 1951

Darling 
This section is an excerpt from Electoral results for the Division of Darling § 1951

East Sydney 
This section is an excerpt from Electoral results for the Division of East Sydney § 1951

Eden-Monaro 
This section is an excerpt from Electoral results for the Division of Eden-Monaro § 1951

Evans 
This section is an excerpt from Electoral results for the Division of Evans § 1951

Farrer 
This section is an excerpt from Electoral results for the Division of Farrer § 1951

Grayndler 
This section is an excerpt from Electoral results for the Division of Grayndler § 1951

Gwydir 
This section is an excerpt from Electoral results for the Division of Gwydir § 1951

Hume 
This section is an excerpt from Electoral results for the Division of Hume § 1951

Hunter 
This section is an excerpt from Electoral results for the Division of Hunter § 1951

Kingsford Smith 
This section is an excerpt from Electoral results for the Division of Kingsford Smith § 1951

Lang 
This section is an excerpt from Electoral results for the Division of Lang § 1951

Lawson 
This section is an excerpt from Electoral results for the Division of Lawson § 1951

Lowe 
This section is an excerpt from Electoral results for the Division of Lowe § 1951

Lyne 
This section is an excerpt from Electoral results for the Division of Lyne § 1951

Macarthur 
This section is an excerpt from Electoral results for the Division of Macarthur § 1951

Mackellar 
This section is an excerpt from Electoral results for the Division of Mackellar § 1951

Macquarie 
This section is an excerpt from Electoral results for the Division of Macquarie § 1951

Martin 
This section is an excerpt from Electoral results for the Division of Martin § 1951

Mitchell 
This section is an excerpt from Electoral results for the Division of Mitchell § 1951

New England 
This section is an excerpt from Electoral results for the Division of New England § 1951

Newcastle 
This section is an excerpt from Electoral results for the Division of Newcastle1951

North Sydney 
This section is an excerpt from Electoral results for the Division of North Sydney § 1951

Parkes 
This section is an excerpt from Electoral results for the Division of Parkes (1901–1969) § 1951

Parramatta 
This section is an excerpt from Electoral results for the Division of Parramatta § 1951

Paterson 
This section is an excerpt from Electoral results for the Division of Paterson § 1951

Phillip 
This section is an excerpt from Electoral results for the Division of Phillip § 1951

Reid
This section is an excerpt from Electoral results for the Division of Reid § 1951

Richmond 
This section is an excerpt from Electoral results for the Division of Richmond § 1951

Riverina 
This section is an excerpt from Electoral results for the Division of Riverina § 1951

Robertson 
This section is an excerpt from Electoral results for the Division of Robertson § 1951

Shortland 
This section is an excerpt from Electoral results for the Division of Shortland § 1951

St George 
This section is an excerpt from Electoral results for the Division of St George § 1951

Warringah 
This section is an excerpt from Electoral results for the Division of Warringah § 1951

Watson 
This section is an excerpt from Electoral results for the Division of Watson (1934–1969) § 1951

Wentworth 
This section is an excerpt from Electoral results for the Division of Wentworth § 1951

Werriwa 
This section is an excerpt from Electoral results for the Division of Werriwa § 1951

West Sydney 
This section is an excerpt from Electoral results for the Division of West Sydney § 1951

Victoria

Balaclava 
This section is an excerpt from Electoral results for the Division of Balaclava § 1951

Ballaarat 
This section is an excerpt from Electoral results for the Division of Ballarat § 1951

Batman 
This section is an excerpt from Electoral results for the Division of Batman § 1951

Bendigo 
This section is an excerpt from Electoral results for the Division of Bendigo § 1951

Burke 
This section is an excerpt from Electoral results for the Division of Burke (1949–1955) § 1951

Chisholm 
This section is an excerpt from Electoral results for the Division of Chisholm § 1951

Corangamite 
This section is an excerpt from Electoral results for the Division of Corangamite § 1951

Corio 
This section is an excerpt from Electoral results for the Division of Corio § 1951

Darebin 
This section is an excerpt from Electoral results for the Division of Darebin § 1951

Deakin 
This section is an excerpt from Electoral results for the Division of Deakin § 1951

Fawkner 
This section is an excerpt from Electoral results for the Division of Fawkner § 1951

Flinders 
This section is an excerpt from Electoral results for the Division of Flinders § 1951

Gellibrand 
This section is an excerpt from Electoral results for the Division of Gellibrand § 1951

Gippsland 
This section is an excerpt from Electoral results for the Division of Gippsland § 1951

Henty 
This section is an excerpt from Electoral results for the Division of Henty § 1951

Higgins 
This section is an excerpt from Electoral results for the Division of Higgins § 1951

Higinbotham 
This section is an excerpt from Electoral results for the Division of Higinbotham § 1951

Hoddle 
This section is an excerpt from Electoral results for the Division of Hoddle § 1951

Indi 
This section is an excerpt from Electoral results for the Division of Indi § 1951

Isaacs 
This section is an excerpt from Electoral results for the Division of Isaacs (1949–1969) § 1951

Kooyong 
This section is an excerpt from Electoral results for the Division of Kooyong § 1951

La Trobe 
This section is an excerpt from Electoral results for the Division of La Trobe § 1951

Lalor 
This section is an excerpt from Electoral results for the Division of Lalor § 1951

Mallee 
This section is an excerpt from Electoral results for the Division of Mallee § 1951

Maribyrnong 
This section is an excerpt from Electoral results for the Division of Maribyrnong § 1951

McMillan 
This section is an excerpt from Electoral results for the Division of McMillan § 1951

Melbourne 
This section is an excerpt from Electoral results for the Division of Melbourne § 1951

Melbourne Ports 
This section is an excerpt from Electoral results for the Division of Melbourne Ports § 1951

Murray 
This section is an excerpt from Electoral results for the Division of Murray § 1951

Wannon 
This section is an excerpt from Electoral results for the Division of Wannon § 1951

Wills 
This section is an excerpt from Electoral results for the Division of Wills § 1951

Wimmera 
This section is an excerpt from Electoral results for the Division of Wimmera § 1951

Yarra 
This section is an excerpt from Electoral results for the Division of Yarra § 1951

Queensland

Bowman 
This section is an excerpt from Electoral results for the Division of Bowman § 1951

Brisbane 
This section is an excerpt from Electoral results for the Division of Brisbane § 1951

Capricornia 
This section is an excerpt from Electoral results for the Division of Capricornia § 1951

Darling Downs 
This section is an excerpt from Electoral results for the Division of Darling Downs § 1951

Dawson 
This section is an excerpt from Electoral results for the Division of Dawson § 1951

Fisher 
This section is an excerpt from Electoral results for the Division of Fisher § 1951

Griffith 
This section is an excerpt from Electoral results for the Division of Griffith § 1951

Herbert 
This section is an excerpt from Electoral results for the Division of Herbert § 1951

Kennedy 
This section is an excerpt from Electoral results for the Division of Kennedy § 1951

Leichhardt 
This section is an excerpt from Electoral results for the Division of Leichhardt § 1951

Lilley 
This section is an excerpt from Electoral results for the Division of Lilley § 1951

Maranoa 
This section is an excerpt from Electoral results for the Division of Maranoa § 1951

McPherson 
This section is an excerpt from Electoral results for the Division of McPherson § 1951

Moreton 
This section is an excerpt from Electoral results for the Division of Moreton § 1951

Oxley 
This section is an excerpt from Electoral results for the Division of Oxley § 1951

Petrie 
This section is an excerpt from Electoral results for the Division of Petrie § 1951

Ryan 
This section is an excerpt from Electoral results for the Division of Ryan § 1951

Wide Bay 
This section is an excerpt from Electoral results for the Division of Wide Bay § 1951

South Australia

Adelaide 
This section is an excerpt from Electoral results for the Division of Adelaide § 1951

Angas 
This section is an excerpt from Electoral results for the Division of Angas (1949–1977) § 1949

Barker 
This section is an excerpt from Electoral results for the Division of Barker § 1951

Boothby 
This section is an excerpt from Electoral results for the Division of Boothby § 1951

Grey 
This section is an excerpt from Electoral results for the Division of Grey § 1951

Hindmarsh 
This section is an excerpt from Electoral results for the Division of Hindmarsh § 1951

Kingston 
This section is an excerpt from Electoral results for the Division of Kingston § 1951

Port Adelaide 
This section is an excerpt from Electoral results for the Division of Port Adelaide § 1951

Sturt 
This section is an excerpt from Electoral results for the Division of Sturt § 1951

Wakefield 
This section is an excerpt from Electoral results for the Division of Wakefield § 1951

Western Australia

Canning 
This section is an excerpt from Electoral results for the Division of Canning § 1951

Curtin 
This section is an excerpt from Electoral results for the Division of Curtin § 1951

Forrest 
This section is an excerpt from Electoral results for the Division of Forrest § 1951

Fremantle 
This section is an excerpt from Electoral results for the Division of Fremantle § 1951

Kalgoorlie 
This section is an excerpt from Electoral results for the Division of Kalgoorlie § 1951

Moore 
This section is an excerpt from Electoral results for the Division of Moore § 1951

Perth 
This section is an excerpt from Electoral results for the Division of Perth § 1951

Swan 
This section is an excerpt from Electoral results for the Division of Swan § 1951

Tasmania

Bass 
This section is an excerpt from Electoral results for the Division of Bass § 1951

Darwin 
This section is an excerpt from Electoral results for the Division of Darwin § 1951

Denison 
This section is an excerpt from Electoral results for the Division of Denison § 1951

Franklin 
This section is an excerpt from Electoral results for the Division of Franklin § 1951

Wilmot 
This section is an excerpt from Electoral results for the Division of Wilmot § 1951

Territories

Australian Capital Territory 
This section is an excerpt from Electoral results for the Division of Australian Capital Territory § 1951

Northern Territory 
This section is an excerpt from Electoral results for the Division of Northern Territory § 1951

See also 

 Candidates of the 1951 Australian federal election
 Members of the Australian House of Representatives, 1951–1954

References 

House of Representatives 1951